The 2012 All-Big 12 Conference football team consists of American football players chosen as All-Big 12 Conference players for the 2012 Big 12 Conference football season.  The conference recognizes two official All-Big 12 selectors: (1) the Big 12 conference coaches selected separate offensive and defensive units and named first- and second-team players (the "Coaches" team); and (2) a panel of sports writers and broadcasters covering the Big 12 also selected offensive and defensive units and named first- and second-team players (the "Media" team).

Offensive selections

Quarterbacks
 Collin Klein, Kansas State (Coaches-1; Media-1)
 Geno Smith, West Virginia (Coaches-2 (tie); Media-2)
 Landry Jones, Oklahoma (Coaches-2 (tie))

Running backs
 Joseph Randle, Oklahoma State (Coaches-1; Media-1)
 John Hubert, K-State (Coaches-1)
 James Sims, Kansas (Coaches-2; Media-2)
 Damien Williams, Oklahoma (Coaches-2)

Fullbacks
 Trey Millard, Oklahoma (Coaches-1)
 Kye Staley, Oklahoma State (Coaches-2)

Centers
 Gabe Ikard, Oklahoma (Coaches-1, Media-1)
 Joe Madsen, West Virginia (Media-2; Coaches-2)

Guards
 Cyril Richardson, Baylor (Coaches-1; Media-1)
 Lane Taylor, Oklahoma State (Coaches-1; Media-1)
 B. J. Finney, Kansas State (Media-1)
 Blaize Foltz, TCU (Coaches-2; Media-2)
 Trey Hopkins, Texas (Coaches-2)
 Ivory Wade, Baylor (Media-2)

Tackles
 LaAdrian Waddle, Texas Tech (Coaches-1; Media-1)
 Cornelius Lucas, Kansas State (Coaches-1; Media-2)
 Tanner Hawkinson, Kansas (Coaches-2; Media-2)
 Lane Johnson, Oklahoma (Coaches-2)

Tight ends
 Travis Tannahill, Kansas State (Coaches-1; Media-1)
 Jace Amaro, Texas Tech (Coaches-2)
 Trey Millard, Oklahoma (Media-2)

Receivers
 Stedman Bailey, West Virginia (Coaches-1; Media-1)
 Terrance Williams, Baylor (Coaches-1; Media-1)
 Tavon Austin, West Virginia (Coaches-1; Media-2)
 Josh Stewart, Oklahoma State (Media-1)
 Darrin Moore, Texas Tech (Coaches-2; Media-2)
 Kenny Stills, Oklahoma (Coaches-2; Media-2)
 Chris Harper, K-State (Coaches-2)
 Eric Ward, Texas Tech (Media-2)

Defensive selections

Defensive linemen
 Devonte Fields, TCU (Coaches-1; Media-1)
 Alex Okafor, Texas (Coaches-1; Media-1)
 Meshak Williams, Kansas State (Coaches-1; Media-1)
 Calvin Barnett, Oklahoma State (Media-2; Coaches-1)
 Kerry Hyder, Texas Tech (Coaches-2; Media-1)
 Stansly Maponga, TCU (Coaches-1; Media-2)
 Adam Davis, Kansas State (Coaches-2; Media-2)
 Jake McDonough, Iowa State (Coaches-1)
 Dartwan Bush, Texas Tech (Media-2)
 Chucky Hunter, TCU (Coaches-2)
 David King, Oklahoma (Coaches-2)
 Vai Lutui, Kansas State (Coaches-2)

Linebackers
 Arthur Brown, Kansas State (Coaches-1; Media-1)
 A. J. Klein, Iowa State (Coaches-1; Media-1)
 Jake Knott, Iowa State (Coaches-1; Media-1)
 Kenny Cain, TCU (Coaches-2; Media-1)
 Bryce Hager, Baylor (Coaches-2; Media-2)
 Ben Heeney, Kansas (Coaches-2; Media-2)
 Eddie Lackey, Baylor (Media-2)
 Shaun Lewis, Oklahoma State (Media-2)

Defensive backs
 Aaron Colvin, Oklahoma (Coaches-1; Media-1)
 Tony Jefferson, Oklahoma (Coaches-1; Media-1)
 Jason Verrett, TCU (Coaches-1; Media-1)
 Ty Zimmerman, Kansas State (Coaches-1; Media-1)
 Kenny Vaccaro, Texas (Coaches-1; Media-2)
 Sam Carter, TCU (Coaches-2; Media-2)
 Durrell Givens, Iowa State (Coaches-2; Media-2)
 Nigel Malone, Kansas State (Media-2)
 Cody Davis, Texas Tech (Coaches-2)
 Bradley McDougald, Kansas (Coaches-2)
 D.J. Johnson, Texas Tech (Coaches-2)
 Demontre Hurst, Oklahoma (Coaches-2)

Special teams

Kickers
 Quinn Sharp, Oklahoma State (Coaches-1; Media-1)
 Anthony Cantele, Kansas State (Coaches-2; Media-2)

Punters
 Quinn Sharp, Oklahoma State (Coaches-1; Media-1)
 Alex King, Texas (Media-2)
 Kirby Van Der Kamp, Iowa State (Coaches-2)

All-purpose / Return specialists
 Tavon Austin, West Virginia (Coaches-1; Media-1)
 Justin Gilbert, Oklahoma State (Coaches-2)
 Tyler Lockett, Kansas State (Media-2)

Key
Bold = selected as a first-team player by both the coaches and media panel

Coaches = selected by Big 12 Conference coaches

Media = selected by a media panel

See also
2012 College Football All-America Team

References

All-Big 12 Conference
All-Big 12 Conference football teams